Anthrapurpurin, or 1,2,7-trihydroxyanthraquinone, is a purple dye used in histology for the detection of calcium.

See also
 Alizarin
 Purpurin
 Trihydroxyanthraquinone
 Hydroxyanthraquinone
 Anthraquinone

References

Trihydroxyanthraquinones
Anthraquinone dyes